= Ramat Yotam Caldera =

Proterozoic volcano

Coordinates: 29.55°N 34.90°E

The Ramat Yotam Caldera is a Proterozoic volcano located about 2 km (1.2 mi) west of Eilat in southernmost Israel. It formed 548 million years ago at the southern end of the Ramat Yotam graben.
